The Battle of Artah was fought in 1105 between Crusader forces and the Seljuk Turks at the town of Artah near Antioch. The Turks were led by Fakhr al-Mulk Ridwan of Aleppo, while the Crusaders were led by Tancred, Prince of Galilee, regent of the Principality of Antioch. The Crusaders were victorious and proceeded to threaten Aleppo itself.

Background 
After the great Crusader defeat at the Battle of Harran in 1104, all of Antioch's strongholds east of the Orontes River were abandoned. In order to raise additional Crusader reinforcements, Bohemond of Taranto embarked for Europe, leaving Tancred as regent in Antioch. The new regent began to patiently recover the lost castles and walled towns.

Artah was the last Crusader-held fortress east of the city of Antioch and its loss could result in a direct threat to the city by Muslim forces. It is unclear if Ridwan thereafter garrisoned Artah.

Battle 
With a force of 1,000 cavalry and 9,000 infantry, Tancred laid siege to the castle of Artah. Ridwan of Aleppo tried to interfere with the operation, gathering a host of 7,000 infantry and an unknown number of cavalry. 3,000 of the Muslim infantrymen were volunteers. Tancred gave battle and defeated the army of Aleppo. The Latin prince is supposed to have won by his "skillful use of ground." The Franks may have gained a tactical advantage by using the "device of a feigned retreat." The Muslim infantry entered the Crusader camp after the initial Crusader retreat and were then surprised and killed by the Crusaders, with only a small number escaping.

Aftermath 
Tancred proceeded to consolidate the Principality's control of its eastern frontier regions, precipitating the flight of local Muslims from the areas of the al-Jazr and Lailun, although several were slain by Tancred's forces. After his victory, Tancred expanded his conquests east of the Orontes with only minor opposition. The next actions of consequence in northern Syria were the Battle of Shaizar in 1111 and the Battle of Sarmin in 1115.

Citations

Bibliography

 

Artah
Battles involving the Seljuk Empire
Conflicts in 1105
12th century in the Seljuk Empire
1105 in Asia
1100s in the Crusader states